Gullstein is a village in Aure Municipality in Møre og Romsdal county, Norway.  The village is located on the eastern side of the island of Tustna.  The Soleimsund Bridge connects Gullstein (and the island of Tustna) to the neighboring island of Stabblandet to the east.  The village was the administrative centre of the former municipality of Tustna which became part of Aure Municipality in 2006.  The village is the site of Gullstein Church.

References

Villages in Møre og Romsdal
Aure, Norway